A herder is a worker who cares for domestic animals, in places where these animals wander pasture lands.

Herder may also refer to:

People 
 Herder (surname)
 Johann Gottfried Herder, German philosopher and literary critic
 Herder Vázquez (born 1967), Colombian long-distance runner

Other uses
 Bot herder
 Herder, Alberta, Canada
 Herder Prize, named after J.G. Herder
 Verlag Herder, German publishing house

See also 
 Herd (disambiguation)
 Herding